Dry Arch Park is the home ground of Bonagee United, an Irish football team. It is located close to central Letterkenny in County Donegal.

The ground takes its name from a railway bridge "The Dry Arch" which was situated about 1 km from the pitch. The bridge was knocked down on construction of the dual carriageway in the early 1990s. The Dry Arch Bar, which is situated directly beside the pitch, is also named after the bridge.

The current grounds include a spectator stand, multipurpose hall, meeting rooms, 5-a-side artificial pitch, 6-a-side artificial pitch, 3 changing rooms and separate shower and changing facilities for referees.

The development was supported by government grants as well as by the local people.

External links
 [bonageeunitedfc.webs.com]

Buildings and structures in Letterkenny
Association football venues in the Republic of Ireland
Sport in Letterkenny
Association football venues in County Donegal